Robert Earl Vaughn (born July 7, 1987) is an American baseball coach and former catcher. He is the head baseball coach at the University of Maryland, College Park. He played college baseball at Kansas State University from 2006 to 2009 for coach Brad Hill before pursuing a professional career from 2009 to 2010.

Coaching career
He signed to a five-year extension in July 2021. During the 2022 NCAA Division I baseball season, Vaughn led Maryland to a 44–10 record, the program’s best regular season in program history. He was subsequently named the Big Ten Coach of the Year.

Head coaching record

See also
 List of current NCAA Division I baseball coaches

References

1987 births
Living people
Baseball catchers
Kansas State Wildcats baseball coaches
Kansas State Wildcats baseball players
Maryland Terrapins baseball coaches
Sportspeople from Corpus Christi, Texas
Bristol White Sox players
Kannapolis Intimidators players
Great Falls Voyagers players
Baseball coaches from Texas